The Cherwell Valley line is the railway line between Didcot and  via . It links the Great Western Main Line and the south to the Chiltern Main Line and the Midlands. The line follows the River Cherwell for much of its route between Banbury and Oxford.

Current and former stations served

, formerly called Banbury Bridge Street

Former station at 
Former station at 
, formerly called Lower Heyford

Former station at  previously called Woodstock Road
Former halt at 

Former halt at Hinksey
Former halt at Abingdon Road

Former station at 
, formerly called Abingdon Road

Didcot Parkway, formerly called Didcot

The former station for Bletchingdon was always spelt "Bletchington", which is an alternative spelling for that village's toponym. The former halt at Wolvercote was called "Wolvercot Platform", with a deliberately different spelling of the village's name, to distinguish it from the London and North Western Railway's nearby .

The line has a maximum speed of 110 mph (177 km/h).

Services
Passenger services are provided by CrossCountry and Great Western Railway.

The line carries a large and increasing volume of freight between the Port of Southampton and the Midlands, much of it container trains operated by Freightliner.

Tilting
With the exception of the West Coast Main Line, this route was the only route on which domestic UK trains could tilt, something of which Virgin CrossCountry took advantage of, using Class 221 Super Voyagers from 2004. After Virgin CrossCountry's successor CrossCountry elected to remove the tilting equipment from its Class 221s to increase reliability and reduce costs, tilt running ceased in 2008.

River Thames
The line makes three crossings of the River Thames between Oxford and Didcot:
 
Osney Rail Bridge
Nuneham Railway Bridge
Appleford Railway Bridge

Electrification

In 1977 the Parliamentary Select Committee on Nationalised Industries recommended considering electrification of more of Britain's rail network, and by 1979 BR presented a range of options to do so by 2000. Some of these options would have included the whole Cherwell Valley line and the Banbury–Birmingham section of what is now the Chiltern Main Line plus the Coventry to Leamington line. The 1979–90 Conservative governments that succeeded the 1976–79 Labour government did not implement the proposal.

Under plans for the Great Western Electrification project announced in July 2009, the Cherwell Valley line was due to be electrified from Didcot as far as Oxford. However, delays and cost overruns elsewhere caused this to be deferred indefinitely in 2016.

References

Railway lines in South East England
Rail transport in Oxfordshire
Transport in Oxford
Banbury